Harmonicraft is the third studio album by American heavy metal band Torche. It was released in 2012 on Volcom Entertainment. Harmonicraft was self-produced by Torche and mixed by Converge guitarist Kurt Ballou.

Reception

The album was listed 30th on Stereogum's list of top 50 albums of 2012.

Track listing

Personnel
Band members
Steve Brooks – guitars and vocals
Andrew Elstner – guitars and vocals
Jonathan Nuñez – bass, guitar, synthesizer, production and recording
Rick Smith – drums

Other personnel
Kurt Ballou – mixing
Alan Douches – mastering
Santos – album artwork

References

Torche albums
2012 albums
Volcom Entertainment albums
Albums produced by Kurt Ballou